Two is the second studio album by Canadian country music artist Tebey. It was released on March 11, 2014 via Road Angel Entertainment and distributed by Warner Music Canada. The album includes a cover of Avicii's "Wake Me Up" featuring Emerson Drive. It reached the top 10 on the Billboard Canada Country chart.

Critical reception
Mark Weber of the Lacombe Express wrote that "Tebey sounds terrific from song to song, like he’s pouring an unbridled expression and enthusiasm into every note."

Track listing

Charts

Singles

References

2014 albums
Tebey albums
Warner Music Group albums